{{DISPLAYTITLE:C5H9NO2}}
The molecular formula C5H9NO2 (molar mass : 115.13 g/mol) may refer to:

 Allylglycine
 (+)-cis-2-Aminomethylcyclopropane carboxylic acid
 N-Formylmorpholine
 Proline, an amino acid